The year 1606 in science and technology involved some significant events.

Cryptography
 The cryptographic text Steganographia, written by Johannes Trithemius c.1499/1500, is published in Frankfurt.

Exploration
 February 26
 Dutch navigator Willem Janszoon makes the first confirmed sighting of Australia by a European.
 Pedro Fernandes de Queirós discovers the Pitcairn Islands.
 March – The Duke of York's ship Duyfken, under Captain Willem Janszoon, explores the western coast of Cape York Peninsula.
 May – Pedro Fernandes de Queirós discovers the islands of Vanuatu; believing them to be Australia, he names them .
 October – Luís Vaz de Torres is the first European to sail through the Torres Strait.

Mathematics
 Giovanni Antonio Magini devises trigonometric tables of high accuracy.

Physics
 Approx. date – Galileo invents a thermometer based on the expansion of gas.

Technology
 The first recorded instance of a bayonet published in the Chinese military treatise .

Births
 January 4 (bapt.) – Edmund Castell, English orientalist (died 1685)

Deaths
 September 28 – Nicolaus Taurellus, German philosopher and scientist (born 1547)
 November 13 – Girolamo Mercuriale, Italian physician and historian (born 1530)
 Lucas Janszoon Waghenaer, Dutch nautical chart maker (born 1533/4)

References

 
17th century in science
1600s in science